Del Mar Heights may refer to:

 Del Mar Heights, San Diego
 Del Mar Heights, Texas